Mikhail Youzhny was the defending champion but lost in the quarterfinals to Guillermo Coria.

Coria won in the final 6–2, 6–2, 6–1 against Tommy Robredo.

Seeds
A champion seed is indicated in bold text while text in italics indicates the round in which that seed was eliminated. All sixteen seeds received a bye to the second round.

Draw

Finals

Top half

Section 1

Section 2

Bottom half

Section 3

Section 4

External links
 2003 Mercedes Cup draw

Singles 2003
Stuttgart Singles